"You Are My Treasure' is a 1968 single by Jack Greene.  "You Are My Treasure" was Jack Greene's third number one on the country chart.  The single spent a single week at number one and a total of twelve weeks on the country chart.

Chart performance

References

1968 singles
Jack Greene songs
Songs written by Cindy Walker
1968 songs
Song recordings produced by Owen Bradley
Decca Records singles